PRO Romania (PRO) is a minor extra-parliamentary social liberal political party in Romania.

History 

The founding of PRO Romania was initiated in 2017 by former Prime Minister Victor Ponta, former acting/ad interim Prime Minister and Minister of Education Sorin Cîmpeanu, and former Deputy Prime Minister and Minister of Environment and Climate Change Daniel Constantin. The party was formally established on 20 February 2018 in Bucharest

Corina Crețu, European Commissioner for Regional Policy, announced on 17 January 2019 that she would be a candidate in the European Parliament election on behalf of PRO Romania. She would be at the second position in the list after Victor Ponta.

Only four days later, senator and former Minister of National Defence Adrian Țuțuianu announced that he joined the party, becoming the first senator to join PRO Romania.

In 2019, PRO Romania was represented in the Romanian Parliament by 20 deputies and 1 senator and in the European Parliament by 2 MEPs.

The party joined the European political party European Democratic Party (EDP) in February 2019. However, its MEPs sit in the Progressive Alliance of Socialists and Democrats (PES) and not in the Renew Europe group.

In 2020, the Alliance of Liberals and Democrats (ALDE) merged into PRO Romania, and the expanded party has renamed itself  PRO Romania Social-Liberal.

Nevertheless, on 26 January 2021, the executive bureau of PRO Romania met to stop the merger procedure between the party and ALDE, thereby formally ceasing the union between the two parties.

In October 2022, the party became an observer member of the Party of European Socialists.

Members 

Since its establishment, many high-profile former members of PSD or ALDE have joined PRO Romania, including:

 Nicolae Bănicioiu - member of the Chamber of Deputies and former Minister of Health;
 Ioana Petrescu - former Minister of Finance;
 Augustin Jianu - former Minister of Communications and Information Society;
 Mircea Dobre - member of the Chamber of Deputies and former Minister of Tourism;
 Gabriela Podașcă, Cătălin Nechifor, Mircea Banias, Emilia Meiroșu, Mihaela Huncă, Eugen Durbacă, Alin Văcaru, Adrian Pau - members of the Chamber of Deputies;
 Răzvan Cotovelea - former Minister of Communications and Information Society;
 Adrian Țuțuianu - senator and former Minister of National Defence.

Leadership

Electoral history

Legislative elections

Notes:

1  The MPs were elected on PSD's and ALDE's lists.

Local elections

Presidential elections 

Notes:

1 Mircea Diaconu was the candidate of the "One Man" alliance; The alliance's members were PRO Romania and ALDE.

European elections

References

External links
Official website

2018 establishments in Romania
European Democratic Party
Liberal parties in Romania
Political parties established in 2018
Registered political parties in Romania
Social liberal parties